Traveller Supplement 3: The Spinward Marches is a 1979 role-playing game supplement for Traveller published by Game Designers' Workshop.

Contents
The Spinward Marches includes a description and maps of a region of space, with basic data on hundreds of worlds.

Reception
Forrest Johnson reviewed The Spinward Marches in The Space Gamer No. 28. Johnson commented that "A game master with Book 3 could create a similar region, but this is a time-saver."

Bob McWilliams reviewed The Spinward Marches for White Dwarf #20, giving it an overall rating of 9 out of 10, and stated that "Perhaps the most interesting features are the political and historical snippets in the introduction and heading each set of subsector statistics; they help define the nature of the Imperium and its neighbours in the Marches region of space, and I wish there had been room for more of this background. This is an essential booklet for anyone using Traveller material 'straight'."

References

Role-playing game supplements introduced in 1979
Traveller (role-playing game) supplements